HMS Ready (J226) was a turbine engine-powered  during the Second World War. She survived the war and was sold to Belgium in 1951 as Van Haverbeke (M902).

Design and description

The ships' complement consisted of 85 officers and ratings.

The reciprocating ships had two vertical triple-expansion steam engines, each driving one shaft, using steam provided by two Admiralty three-drum boilers.

The Algerine class was armed with a QF  Mk V anti-aircraft gun and four twin-gun mounts for Oerlikon 20 mm cannon. The latter guns were in short supply when the first ships were being completed and they often got a proportion of single mounts. By 1944, single-barrel Bofors 40 mm mounts began replacing the twin 20 mm mounts on a one for one basis. All of the ships were fitted for four throwers and two rails for depth charges.

Construction and career

Service in the Royal Navy 
The ship was ordered on 15 November 1940 at the Harland & Wolff at Belfast, Ireland. She was laid down on 14 April 1942 and launched on 11 January 1943. She was commissioned on 21 May 1943.

Ready was decommissioned in 1948.

She was then sold to Belgium in 1951.

Service in the Belgian Navy 
Ready was renamed Van Haverbeke and was commissioned on 4 July 1951.

Left Ostend on 5 August 1955 and made a stopover in Leith (Scotland) from 22 to 24 and joined Ostend on the 29th, after having patrolled the fishing grounds of the Fladen Grounds, Long Forties, Old Devil-Hole and Gut.

In 1956, Princess Grace and Prince Rainier of Monaco, as well as Princess Paola and Prince Albert were visiting on board during the Belgian Centenary Days in Monte-Carlo.

Surveillance campaign of fishing grounds, joined the port of Ostend on 26 July 1957. On 28 July, she escorted the Tna Kamina to Harwich (Great Britain). Set sail from Ostend on August 15 during which she took part in the Blessing of the Sea ceremonies at Heist-sur-Mer, and made a stopover on 22 to 25 August in Aberdem (Scotland), and return to Ostend on 31 August. She returned to her home port on 23 September.

She again left Ostend on 7 October 1957 to begin her 7th and final trip of the year. She made a stopover in Hamburg from 10 to 13 of the same month and reached Ostend on 15 October. Took part in the communal festivals of Vilvoorde and visited the port of Brussels from 18 to 21 October.

The ship was decommissioned in June 1960 and sold for to Mr. Bakker P.V.B.A, Bruges for scrap on 7 March 1961.

References

Bibliography
 
 
 Peter Elliott (1977) Allied Escort Ships of World War II. MacDonald & Janes,

External links
 

 

Algerine-class minesweepers of the Royal Navy
Ships built in Belfast
1943 ships
World War II minesweepers of the United Kingdom
Algerine-class minesweepers of the Belgian Navy